This article lists charts each team's try scorers from the first Rugby World Cup to date.  The list does not include penalty tries.

Statistics correct after Japan vs South Africa, 20 October 2019.

7 tries
Juan José Imhoff
6 tries
Julián Montoya
4 tries
Pablo Bouza
Felipe Contepomi
Ignacio Corleto
Martín Gaitán
Joaquín Tuculet
3 tries
Lucas Borges
Manuel Contepomi
Santiago Cordero
Juan Martín Hernández
Juan Manuel Leguizamón
Matías Moroni
Martín Terán
2 tries
Horacio Agulla
Diego Albanese
Federico Martín Aramburú
Lisandro Arbizu
Tomás Cubelli
Juan Cruz Mallia
Nicolás Fernández Miranda
Lucas González Amorosino
Juan Lanza
Guido Petti
Agustín Pichot
Nicolás Sánchez
1 try
Patricio Albacete
Matías Alemanno
Alejandro Allub
Gonzalo Bertranou
Santiago Carreras
José Cilley
Matías Corral
Rodrigo Crexell
Jeronimo de la Fuente
Julio Farías Cabello
Santiago Fernández
Juan Fernández Miranda
Genaro Fessia
Juan Figallo
Hernán García Simón
Fabio Gómez
Agustín Gosio
Omar Hasan
Facundo Isa
Martín Landajo
Tomás Lavanini
Gonzalo Longo
Rolando Martín
Federico Méndez
Lucas Noguera Paz
Patricio Noriega
Juan Pablo Orlandi
Rodrigo Roncero
Leonardo Senatore
Gonzalo Tiesi
Federico Todeschini

14 tries
Drew Mitchell
12 tries
Adam Ashley-Cooper
11 tries
Chris Latham
10 tries
David Campese
8 tries
Matt Giteau
7 tries
Joe Roff
6 tries
Matt C. Burke
Tim Horan
Lote Tuqiri
5 tries
Berrick Barnes
Matt P. Burke
Tevita Kuridrani
Stirling Mortlock
David Pocock
Mat Rogers
4 tries
Rocky Elsom
Michael Lynagh
Ben McCalman
George Smith
3 tries
George Gregan
Dane Haylett-Petty
Michael Hooper
Toutai Kefu
Marika Koroibete
Stephen Larkham
Andrew Slack
Ben Tune
2 tries
David Codey
Anthony Fainga'a
Bernard Foley
Michael Foley
Adam Freier
Will Genia
Peter Grigg
Phil Kearns
Tolu Latu
Andrew Leeds
David Lyons
Sean McMahon
Marty Roebuck
Brian Smith
Damian Smith
Morgan Turinui
1 try
Ben Alexander
Al Baxter
Kurtley Beale
Tony Daly
Jack Dempsey
Owen Finegan
Elton Flatley
Nathan Grey
Mark Hartill
Reece Hodge
Stephen Hoiles
Rob Horne
James Horwill
Digby Ioane
Rod Kafer
Sekope Kepu
Samu Kerevi
Jason Little
Salesi Ma'afu
Pat McCabe
Andrew McIntyre
Stephen Moore
Dean Mumm
James O'Connor
Brett Papworth
Jeremy Paul
Jordan Petaia
Simon Poidevin
John Roe
Wendell Sailor
Radike Samo
Nathan Sharpe
Rob Simmons
Peter Slattery
James Slipper
Henry Speight
Tiaan Straaus
Ilivasi Tabua
Joe Tomane
Matt To'omua
Steve Tuynman
Chris Whitaker
Nic White
David Wilson

5 tries
D. T. H. van der Merwe
4 tries
Al Charron
Morgan Williams
3 tries
Rod Snow
2 tries
Aaron Carpenter
Phil Mackenzie
Kyle Nichols
Pat Palmer
Ryan Smith
Winston Stanley
Conor Trainor
Paul Vaesen
1 try
Aaron Abrams
Mark Cardinal
Andrew Coe
Jamie Cudmore
Craig Culpan
Glen Ennis
Matt Evans
Sean Fauth
Rob Frame
Quentin Fyffe
Jeff Hassler
Matt Heaton
Mike James
Colin McKenzie
Gordon McKinnon
Ander Monro
Pat Riordan
Robert Ross
Jebb Sinclair
Scott Stewart
Ian Stuart
Kevin Tkachuk
Chris Tynan
Mark Wyatt

1 try
Aboubakar Camara
Alfred Okou
Aboubacar Soulama

11 tries
Rory Underwood
7 tries
Will Greenwood
6 tries
Chris Ashton
Josh Lewsey
Dan Luger
5 tries
Neil Back
Mike Harrison
Jason Robinson
Manu Tuilagi
4 tries
Will Carling
Mark Cueto
Jeremy Guscott
Jonny May
Jack Nowell
Paul Sackey
Anthony Watson
3 tries
Iain Balshaw
Martin Corry
Luke Cowan-Dickie
Nick Easter
Phil Greening
Ben Youngs
2 tries
Mike Brown
Mike Catt
Ben Cohen
Joe Cokanasiga
Matt Dawson
Phil de Glanville
Ben Foden
George Ford
Andy Gomarsall
Shontayne Hape
Austin Healey
Richard Hill
Matt Perry
Tony Underwood
Peter Winterbottom
Billy Vunipola
1 try
Stuart Abbott
Delon Armitage
Olly Barkley
Nick Beal
Tom Croft
Lawrence Dallaglio
Elliot Daly
Matt Dawson
Wade Dooley
Andy Farrell
Jamie George
Nigel Heslop
Lewis Ludlam
Ruaridh McConnochie
Lewis Moody
Nigel Redman
Gary Rees
Tom Rees
Mark Regan
Dean Richards
Jamie Salmon
Kevin Simms
Kyle Sinckler
Micky Skinner
Henry Slade
Mathew Tait
Steve Thompson
Mike Tindall
Phil Vickery
Jonathan Webb
Jonny Wilkinson

5 tries
Vereniki Goneva
4 tries
Viliame Satala
3 tries
Rupeni Caucaunibuca
Vilimoni Delasau
Fero Lasagavibau
Kele Leawere
Akapusi Qera
2 tries
Norman Ligairi
Nikola Matawalu
Kini Murimurivalu
Nemani Nadolo
Apisai Naevo
Salacieli Naivilawasa
Leone Nakarawa
Waisea Nayacalevu
Semi Radradra
Api Ratuniyarawa
Kameli Ratuvou
Imanueli Tiko
Aisea Tuilevu
Josua Tuisova
Marika Vunibaka
1 try
Jioji Cama
Tevita Cavubati
Jimi Damu
Graham Dewes
Mesu Dolokoto
Peceli Gale
Emori Katalau
Nemia Kenatale
Semi Kunatani
Frank Lomani
Eroni Mawi
Alfie Mocelutu
Meli Nakauta
Kavekini Nalaga
Napolioni Nalaga
Pita Naruma
Isoa Neivua
Manasa Qoro
Seru Rabeni
Aca Ratuva
Jacob Rauluni
Ilaitia Savai
Greg Smith
Netani Talei
Seta Tawake
Alfred Uluinayau
Ben Volavola
Peceli Yato

11 tries
Vincent Clerc
8 tries
Christophe Dominici
6 tries
Jean-Baptiste Lafond
Émile Ntamack
5 tries
Didier Camberabero
Philippe Saint-André
Philippe Sella
4 tries
Philippe Bernat-Salles
Denis Charvet
Yannick Jauzion
Thierry Lacroix
Patrice Lagisquet
Lionel Nallet
Laurent Rodriguez
3 tries
Thierry Dusautoir
Gaël Fickou
Imanol Harinordoquy
Brian Liebenberg
Rodolphe Modin
Ugo Mola
2 tries
Pierre Berbizier
Serge Betsen
Serge Blanco
Julien Bonnaire
Sébastien Chabal
Jean-Jacques Crenca
Richard Dourthe
Wesley Fofana
Xavier Garbajosa
Sofiane Guitoune
Raphaël Ibañez
Guy Laporte
Alain Lorieux
Olivier Magne
Frédéric Michalak
Yannick Nyanga
Pascal Papé
Clément Poitrenaud
Alivereti Raka
Aurélien Rougerie
Olivier Roumat
Rabah Slimani
François Trinh-Duc
Virimi Vakatawa
1 try
Guy Accoceberry
Marc Andrieu
Lionel Beauxis
Abdelatif Benazzi
Yannick Bru
Sébastien Bruno
Nicolas Brusque
Thomas Castaignède
Arnaud Costes
Daniel Dubroca
Antoine Dupont
Pépito Elhorga
Jean-Baptiste Élissalde
Dominique Erbani
Patrick Estève
Fabien Galthié
Stéphane Glas
Rémy Grosso
Guilhem Guirado
Cédric Heymans
Aubin Hueber
Yoann Huget
Christophe Juillet
Christophe Lamaison
Rémy Martin
David Marty
Nicolas Mas
Maxime Médard
Maxime Mermoz
Pierre Mignoni
Charles Ollivon
Morgan Parra
Fabien Pelous
Louis Picamoles
Julien Pierre
Jefferson Poirot
Jean-Baptiste Poux
Baptiste Serin
William Téchoueyres
Damien Traille
Sébastien Vahaamahina
Sébastien Viars

4 tries
Mamuka Gorgodze
2 tries
Levan Chilachava
Sandro Todua
1 try
Dimitri Basilaia
Jaba Bregvadze
David Dadunashvili
Akvsenti Giorgadze
Otar Giorgadze
David Kacharava
Lasha Khmaladze
Giorgi Kveseladze
Irakli Machkhaneli
Zviad Maissuradze
Lasha Malaghuradze
Shalva Mamukashvili
Giorgi Shkinin
Giorgi Tkhilaishvili
Beka Tsiklauri

8 tries
Keith Earls
7 tries
Brian O'Driscoll
6 tries
Rob Kearney
5 tries
Keith Wood
4 tries
Rory Best
Tommy Bowe
Hugo MacNeill
Brian Robinson
3 tries
Andrew Conway
Denis Hickie
Brendan Mullin
Nick Popplewell
Alan Quinlan
Johnny Sexton
2 tries
David Corkery
Keith Crossan
Girvan Dempsey
Eric Elwood
Tadhg Furlong
Simon Geoghegan
Eddie Halvey
Shane Horgan
Noel Mannion
Denis McBride
Eric Miller
Seán O'Brien
Conor O'Shea
Garry Ringrose
Andrew Trimble
1 try
Justin Bishop
Isaac Boss
Michael Bradley
Tony Buckley
Victor Costello
Seán Cronin
David Curtis
Guy Easterby
Simon Easterby
Luke Fitzgerald
Jerry Flannery
Neil Francis
Gary Halpin
Gordon Hamilton
Iain Henderson
Chris Henry
Robbie Henshaw
Niall Hogan
Marcus Horan
David Humphreys
Shane Jennings
David Kearney
John Kelly
Michael Kiernan
Jordan Larmour
Kevin Maggs
Fergus McFadden
Geordan Murphy
Jordi Murphy
Conor Murray
Dion O'Cuinneagain
Patrick O'Hara
Peter O'Mahony
Jared Payne
James Ryan
Trevor Ringland
Rhys Ruddock
Brian Spillane
CJ Stander
Jim Staples
Thomas Tierney
Andrew Ward

5 tries
Marcello Cuttitta
4 tries
Paolo Vaccari
3 tries
Sergio Parisse
2 tries
Tommaso Allan
Mattia Bellini
Tommaso Benvenuti
Dennis Dallan
Diego Dominguez
Edoardo Gori
Andrea Masi
Matteo Minozzi
Giulio Toniolatti
Alessandro Zanni
1 try
Stefano Barba
Mauro Bergamasco
Mirco Bergamasco
Massimo Bonomi
Dean Budd
Carlo Canna
Martin Castrogiovanni
Giancarlo Cucchiella
Massimo Cuttitta
Manuel Dallan
Santiago Dellapè
Ivan Francescato
Fabio Gaetaniello
Gonzalo Garcia
Mario Gerosa
Marzio Innocenti
Massimo Mascioletti
Luke McLean
Alessandro Moscardi
Sebastian Negri
Luciano Orquera
Matthew Phillips
Jake Polledri
Michele Rizzo
Leonardo Sarto
Marko Stanojevic
Braam Steyn
Tito Tebaldi
Alessandro Troncon
Giovanbattista Venditti
Federico Zani

6 tries
Kotaro Matsushima
4 tries
Kenki Fukuoka
Eiji Kutsuki
3 tries
Kosuke Endo
Hiroyuki Kajihara
Daisuke Ohata
Hirotoki Onozawa
Yoshihito Yoshida
2 tries
James Arlidge
Michael Leitch
Amanaki Lelei Mafi
Terunori Masuho
Osamu Ota
Nofomuli Taumoefolau
Luke Thompson
1 try
Tsuyoshi Fujita
Yoshikazu Fujita
Ayumu Goromaru
Kensuke Hatakeyama
Toshiyuki Hayashi
Karne Hesketh
Kazuki Himeno
Seiji Hirao
Shota Horie
Masami Horikoshi
Takahiro Hosokawa
Keita Inagaki
Ko Izawa
George Konia
Toru Kurihara
Lappies Labuschagne
Timothy Lafaele
Sinali Latu
Ekeroma Luaiufi
Katsuhiro Matsuo
Andrew Miller
Katsufumi Miyamoto
Tomokazu Soma
Koji Taira
Masanori Takura
Patiliai Tuidraki
Alisi Tupuailei
Akihito Yamada
Kojiro Yoshinaga

2 tries
Jacques Burger
JC Greyling
Heinz Koll
Theuns Kotzé
Johann Tromp
1 try
Chrysander Botha
Johan Deysel
du Preez Grobler
Quinton Hough
Hakkies Husselman
Eben Isaacs
Mario Jacobs
Eugene Jantjies
Bradley Langenhoven
Jacques Nieuwenhuis
Chad Plato
Corne Powell
Arthur Samuelson
Johannes Senekal
Damian Stevens
Danie van Wyk
Piet van Zyl

15 tries
Jonah Lomu
13 tries
Doug Howlett
11 tries
Joe Rokocoko
9 tries
Mils Muliaina
Jeff Wilson
8 tries 
Julian Savea
7 tries
Marc Ellis
John Kirwan
6 tries
Beauden Barrett
Craig Green
Jerome Kaino
Nehe Milner-Skudder
Ma'a Nonu
Ben Smith
Sonny Bill Williams
5 tries
Israel Dagg
John Gallagher
David Kirk
Leon MacDonald
Glen Osborne
Alan Whetton
4 tries
Zac Guildford
Richard Kahui
Josh Kronfeld
Walter Little
Aaron Mauger
Caleb Ralph
Sitiveni Sivivatu
Conrad Smith
Carlos Spencer
Isaia Toeava
3 tries
Jordie Barrett
Zinzan Brooke
Jerry Collins
Andrew Hore
Michael Jones
Byron Kelleher
Richie McCaw
Kieran Read
Eric Rush
Aaron Smith
Rodney So'oialo
Joe Stanley
Brad Thorn
John Timu
Victor Vito
Ali Williams
Terry Wright
2 tries
Scott Barrett
George Bridge
Robin Brooke
Frank Bunce
Bunce also scored one try for Samoa.
Sam Cane
Dan Carter
Andy Earl
Andy Ellis
Nick Evans
Malakai Fekitoa
Craig Innes
Chris Jack
Tawera Kerr-Barlow
Anton Lienert-Brown
Chris Masoe
Keven Mealamu
Kees Meeuws
Joe Moody
Sevu Reece
Buck Shelford
Codie Taylor
Adam Thomson
Reuben Thorne
Va'aiga Tuigamala
Tana Umaga
Brad Weber
Tony Woodcock
1 try
Graeme Bachop
Daniel Braid
Mark Brooke-Cowden
Tony Brown
Dane Coles
Jimmy Cowan
Ryan Crotty
Kieran Crowley
Simon Culhane
Christian Cullen
Craig Dowd
John Drake
Sean Fitzpatrick
Corey Flynn
Shannon Frizell
Daryl Gibson
Mark Hammett
Carl Hayman
Paul Henderson
Jason Hewett
Marty Holah
Alama Ieremia
Rieko Ioane
Cory Jane
Richard Loe
Brendon Leonard
Justin Marshall
Norm Maxwell
Luke McAlister
Bernie McCahill
Steve McDowall
Andrew Mehrtens
Dylan Mika
Richie Mo'unga
Waisake Naholo
TJ Perenara
Graham Purvis
Taine Randell
Brodie Retallick
Scott Robertson
Ardie Savea
Colin Slade
Angus Ta'avao
Warwick Taylor
Matt Todd
Sam Whitelock

1 try
Pedro Carvalho
Rui Cordeiro
Joaquim Ferreira
David Penalva

3 tries
Marius Tincu
2 tries
Adrian Apostol
Mihai Macovei
Florica Murariu
Catalin Sasu
Cristian Săuan
Marcel Toader
1 try
Daniel Carpo
Ionel Cazan
George Chiriac
Florin Corodeanu
Tudor Constantin
Haralambie Dumitraș
Andrei Gurănescu
Liviu Hodorcă
Gheorghe Ion
Mihăiță Lazăr
Adrian Lungu
Valentin Maftei
Mircea Paraschiv
Alin Petrache
Augustin Petrechei
Valentin Popîrlan
Lucian Sîrbu
Gheorghe Solomie
Ion Teodorescu
Petrișor Toderașc
Ovidiu Toniţa
Valentin Ursache

2 tries
Vladimir Ostroushko
Denis Simplikevich
1 try
Vasili Artemyev
Kirill Golosnitsky
Alexey Makovetskiy
Konstantin Rachkov
Alexander Yanyushkin

Including Western Samoa, 1991-95.
10 tries
Brian Lima
4 tries
Alesana Tuilagi
3 tries
Stephen Bachop
George Harder
Semo Sititi
2 tries
Maurie Fa'asavalu
Lome Fa'atau
Dominic Feaunati
Ed Fidow
Kahn Fotuali'i
Silao Leaega
Pat Lam
Rey Lee-Lo
Alapati Leiua
Opeta Palepoi
Fata Sini
Afato So'oalo
George Stowers
Timo Tagaloa
Sailosi Tagicakibau
Shem Tatupu
1 try
Afa Amosa
Frank Bunce
Bunce also scored two tries for New Zealand.
Lio Falaniko
Darren Kellett
Jack Lam
George Leaupepe
Manu Leiataua
Simon Lemalu
Motu Matu'u
Tim Nanai-Williams
Tu Nu'uali'itia
Peter Paramore
Anthony Perenise
Paul Perez
Tusi Pisi
Junior Polu
Steve So'oialo
Henry Taefu
Kane Thompson
Ofisa Treviranus
Mike Umaga
Earl Va'a
Sila Vaifale
To'o Vaega
Tanner Vili
Gavin Williams
Paul Williams

9 tries
Gavin Hastings
7 tries
Iwan Tukalo
6 tries
John Jeffrey
5 tries
Simon Danielli
Scott Hastings
Tommy Seymour
Alan Tait
4 tries
Matt Duncan
Chris Paterson
Tony Stanger
3 tries
Mark Bennett
Ally Hogg
George Horne
Rory Lamont
Martin Leslie
Cameron Murray
Doddie Weir
Derek White
2 tries
Gary Armstrong
Craig Chalmers
John Hardie
Adam Hastings
Greig Laidlaw
Kenny Logan
Sean Maitland
Cameron Mather
WP Nel
Iain Paxton
Finn Russell
Robbie Russell
Graham Shiel
Gregor Townsend
Peter Walton
1 try
Joe Ansbro
John Barclay
Mike Blair
Kelly Brown
Paul Burnell
Chris Cusiter
Rob Dewey
Zander Fagerson
Ross Ford
Stuart Grimes
Duncan Hodge
Peter Horne
Gavin Kerr
Scott Lawson
Shaun Longstaff
Stuart McInally
James McLaren
Glenn Metcalfe
Greig Oliver
Dan Parks
Eric Peters
Budge Pountney
Matt Scott
Gordon Simpson
Tom Smith
Hugo Southwell
Simon Taylor
George Turner
Derek Turnbull
Tim Visser
Rob Wainwright
Duncan Weir
Peter Wright

15 tries
Bryan Habana
9 tries
Jaque Fourie
JP Pietersen
6 tries
Makazole Mapimpi
Danie Rossouw
Joost van der Westhuizen
5 tries
Juan Smith
François Steyn
4 tries
Schalk Burger
Francois Louw
Adriaan Richter
Chester Williams
3 tries
Bakkies Botha
Schalk Brits
Damian de Allende
Fourie du Preez
Francois Hougaard
Cheslin Kolbe
Bongi Mbonambi
Joe van Niekerk
Cobus Reinach
2 tries
Lukhanyo Am
Gio Aplon
Juan de Jongh
Bismarck du Plessis
Robbie Fleck
Warrick Gelant
Derick Hougaard
Deon Kayser
Percy Montgomery
Ruan Pienaar
Bob Skinstad
Morné Steyn
Albert van den Berg
André Vos
1 try
Mark Andrews
Richard Bands
Lood de Jager
Faf de Klerk
Neil de Kock
Thinus Delport
Pieter-Steph du Toit
Eben Etzebeth
Werner Greeff
Pieter Hendriks
Butch James
Siya Kolisi
Jesse Kriel
Ruben Kruger
Anton Leonard
Ollie le Roux
Frans Malherbe
Malcolm Marx
Tendai Mtawarira
Jorrie Müller
Pieter Muller
Lwazi Mvovo
S'busiso Nkosi
Breyton Paulse
Chris Rossouw
Pieter Rossouw
Hendro Scholtz
John Smit
RG Snyman
Gurthrö Steenkamp
Joel Stransky
Adriaan Strauss
Werner Swanepoel
CJ van der Linde
Jaco van der Westhuyzen
Andre Venter
Brendan Venter
Ashwin Willemse
Damian Willemse

No tries scored.

5 tries
Telusa Veainu
3 tries
Sukanaivalu Hufanga
Siale Piutau
2 tries
Mali Hingano
Pierre Hola
Benhur Kivalu
Jack Ram
Sateki Tuipulotu
Fetu'u Vainikolo
Viliami Vaki
1 try
Isileli Fatani
Ipolito Fenukitau
Quddus Fielea
Talai Fifita
Siegfried Fisi'ihoi
Latiume Fosita
Zane Kapeli
Pouvalu Latukefu
Heamani Lavaka
Tukulua Lokotui
Viliami Ma'afu
Finau Maka
Kurt Morath
Mana 'Otai
John Payne
Kisi Pulu
Hale T-Pole
Epi Taione
Sonatane Takulua
Taunaholo Taufahema
Sona Taumalolo
Dave Tiueti
Soane Tonga'uiha
Tevita Tu'ifua
Tevita Vaʻenuku
Joseph Vaka
Fakahau Valu

2 tries
Alfonso Cardoso
Manuel Diana
Pablo Lemoine
1 try
Santiago Arata
Carlos Arboleya
Nicolas Brignoni
Rodrigo Capó
Juan Manuel Cat
German Kessler
Diego Lamelas
Juan Menchaca
Agustín Ormaechea
Diego Ormaechea
Andres Vilaseca

4 tries
Chris Wyles
3 tries
Ray Nelson
Riaan van Zyl
Takudzwa Ngwenya
2 tries
Mike Hercus
Mike Purcell
Kort Schubert
Blaine Scully
Louis Stanfill
Mike Te'o
1 try
Chris Baumann
Bryce Campbell
Kevin Dalzell
Philip Eloff
Paul Emerick
JJ Gagiano
Juan Grobler
Brian Hightower
Kirk Khasigian
Gary Lambert
Tony Lamborn
Titi Lamositele
Paul Lasike
Dan Lyle
Mike MacDonald
Matekitonga Moeakiola
Mike Petri
Kurt Shuman
Kevin Swords

10 tries
Shane Williams
7 tries
Josh Adams
Gareth Davies
Ieuan Evans
Gareth Thomas
5 tries
Colin Charvis
Martyn Williams
4 tries
Jonathan Davies
George North
Sonny Parker
Mark Taylor
Scott Williams
3 tries
Cory Allen
Gareth Cooper
John Devereux
Adrian Hadley
Alun Wyn Jones
Mark Jones
Mike Phillips
Glen Webbe
2 tries
Hallam Amos
Taulupe Faletau
Leigh Halfpenny
Gareth Roberts
Jamie Roberts
Hemi Taylor
Justin Tipuric
Liam Williams
Lloyd Williams
Tomos Williams
1 try
Paul Arnold
Scott Baldwin
Allan Bateman
Bleddyn Bowen
Aled Brew
Lloyd Burns
Lee Byrne
Arthur Emyr
Scott Gibbs
James Hook
Shane Howarth
Robert Howley
Jonathan Humphreys
Dafydd James
Gethin Jenkins
Dafydd Jones
Robert Jones
Stephen Jones
Samson Lee
David Llewellyn
Andy Moore
Kevin Morgan
Paul Moriarty
Ross Moriarty
Hadleigh Parkes
Alan Phillips
Alix Popham
Mark Ring
Nicky Smith
Jonathan Thomas
T. Rhys Thomas
Aaron Wainwright
Sam Warburton

3 tries
Richard Tsimba
2 tries
Adrian Garvey
1 try
Dirk Buitendag
Brendon Dawson
Peter Kaulbach
Mark Neill
Honeywell Nguruve
William Schultz
Conor Shearer

Rugby World Cup
Rugby union records and statistics
Try